The Nehemiah Lovell House was a historic house located in the Osterville section of Barnstable, Massachusetts.

Description and history 
The -story Cape style main block of the house was built c. 1789, which was apparently soon followed by a two-story ell to its east. The house was in the hands of the Fuller family for nearly 100 years, including Captain David Fuller, who was lost at sea in 1854.

Nehemiah Lovell House was listed on the National Register of Historic Places on September 18, 1987. It was demolished in 1994 and a replica built in its place.

See also
National Register of Historic Places listings in Barnstable County, Massachusetts

References

Houses in Barnstable, Massachusetts
National Register of Historic Places in Barnstable, Massachusetts
Houses on the National Register of Historic Places in Barnstable County, Massachusetts
Federal architecture in Massachusetts
Houses completed in 1789
Buildings and structures demolished in 1994
Demolished buildings and structures in Massachusetts